Butter Lamp is a 2013 Chinese-French short drama film directed by Hu Wei. It was nominated for the Academy Award for Best Live Action Short Film at the 87th Academy Awards. The film was shot in a single location and with an entire cast of non-professional actors.

Cast
 Genden Punstock
 Soepha
 Sonam Gonpo
 Wangmo Tso
 Kalsang Dolma
 Zirang Lhamo
 Gangrong Dorjee
 Leung Tso
 Sonam Tashi
 Yang Tso

References

External links
 

2013 films
2013 drama films
2013 short films
French drama short films
Chinese drama films
Chinese short films
Tibetan-language films
2010s French films